Annabelle Dexter-Jones (born 25 October 1986) is a British-American actress and director known for her roles in Succession and Under the Silver Lake. Jones is the daughter of jewellery designer Ann Dexter-Jones and Foreigner guitarist Mick Jones. Through her mother, she is the half-sister of Charlotte Ronson, Samantha Ronson and Mark Ronson. She was born in London, England.

Filmography

Film

Television

References 

British actresses
1986 births
Actresses from London
Living people